MLS Cup 2015 was the 20th edition of the MLS Cup, the championship game of Major League Soccer (MLS). The soccer match was to determine the champion of MLS' 2015 season. The championship was contested on December 6, 2015 between the Columbus Crew SC and the Portland Timbers at MAPFRE Stadium in Columbus, Ohio, with the latter winning 2–1 and earning a berth into the 2016–17 CONCACAF Champions League.

The Timbers' Diego Valeri scored the fastest goal in MLS Cup history at 27 seconds after Crew goalkeeper Steve Clark  miscontrolled his defender's back-pass. Portland doubled their lead in the seventh minute with a goal by Rodney Wallace, and although Columbus got a goal back through Kei Kamara in the 18th minute, the Timbers held on for their first MLS Cup championship. It was the first men's professional sports championship for a team from the city of Portland, Oregon since the Portland Trail Blazers won the 1977 NBA championship.

Road to the final

Tournament Bracket

Match

Summary

Portland opened up the scoring early as midfielder Diego Valeri swiped the ball out from under Columbus goalkeeper Steve Clark and flicked the ball into the back of the net with one touch at the 27-second mark. It was the fastest ever goal scored in an MLS Cup match. The Timbers kept the pressure on, and when the assistant referee failed to call a ball out of bounds after it drifted across the sideline and several Crew players stopped playing, Portland midfielder Darlington Nagbe capitalized, passing to forward Lucas Melano to set the table for a goal by left winger Rodney Wallace that put Portland on top 2–0 in the seventh minute.

In the 18th minute, Columbus got on the board after Portland goalkeeper Adam Kwarasey failed to take control in a scramble at the goal line and Columbus forward Kei Kamara, the league's leading scorer, shot the ball into the net. Kamara's goal to make the game 2–1 ended up as Columbus' only shot on goal of the match.

Portland got a number of opportunities to score in the second half, but the Timbers failed to convert. In the 60th minute, a Portland corner kick resulted in a loose ball in the penalty box, which ricocheted off the goalpost before being cleared after striking Columbus captain Michael Parkhurst's arm on the goal line. However, no handball was called and no goal was awarded. In the 69th minute, Portland striker Fanendo Adi headed the ball toward the goal, but it deflected off the far goalpost and then bounced away off Clark's body. Clark also stopped a point-blank header from Portland center back Nat Borchers in the 81st minute, and then tipped another shot by Adi over the net shortly thereafter. The game ended with a 2–1 scoreline as Columbus was unsuccessful in taking advantage of Portland's missed opportunities, giving the Timbers their first MLS Cup victory and the city of Portland its first men's pro sports championship since the Portland Trail Blazers won the NBA championship in 1977. Valeri was named the match's Most Valuable Player.

Match details

References

2015

Columbus Crew matches
Portland Timbers matches
Sports competitions in Columbus, Ohio
December 2015 sports events in the United States
2015 in sports in Ohio
21st century in Columbus, Ohio